Pomaderris graniticola is a species of flowering plant in the family Rhamnaceae and is endemic to eastern Australia. It is a shrub or small tree with hairy young stems, lance-shaped to elliptic leaves, and sparse panicles of yellow, white or cream-coloured flowers.

Description
The upper surface of the leaves is glabrous and the lower surface has greyish white hairs pressed against the surface. Flowering occurs in September and October.

Taxonomy
This pomaderris was first formally described in 1997 by Neville Grant Walsh and F. Coates who gave it the name Pomaderris argyrophylla subsp. graniticola in the journal Muelleria from specimens Walsh collected in Girraween National Park in 1994. In 2005, Keith Leonard McDougall and Jacqueline C. Millott raised the subspecies to species status as Pomaderris graniticola in the journal Telopea. The specific epithet (graniticola) means "granite dweller".

Distribution and habitat
This pomaderris grows in open forest and scrub near watercourses and is widespread on the granite belt from Stanthorpe and the southern Darling Downs of south-eastern Queensland to the Gibraltar Range and New England regions of New South Wales.

References

graniticola
Flora of New South Wales
Flora of Queensland
Plants described in 1997